The Ems Ukaz or Ems Ukase, was a secret decree (ukaz) of Emperor Alexander II of Russia issued on May 18, 1876, banning the use of the Ukrainian language in print except for reprinting old documents. The ukaz also forbade the import of Ukrainian publications and the staging of plays or lectures in Ukrainian. It was named after the city of Bad Ems, Germany, where it was promulgated.

Background 
In the 1860s, a decade and a half after the Imperial Russian government had broken up the Brotherhood of Sts Cyril and Methodius in Kiev (March 1847) and exiled or arrested its founder Mykola Kostomarov and other prominent figures, Ukrainian intellectuals gained further awareness of their cultural background. Hromada cultural associations, named after the traditional village assembly, started in a number of cities, and Sunday schools started in the cities and towns since the Russian Imperial administration had neglected education. The new cultural movement was partly driven by publications in both Russian and Ukrainian, including journals (such as Kostomarov's Osnova, 1861–62, and Hlibov's Chernyhosvs’kyy Lystok, 1861–63), historical and folkloristic monographs (Kostomarov's biography of the Cossack hetman Bohdan Khmelnytsky, Kulish's two-volume folklore collection Zapiski o Yuzhnoy Rusi, Notes on Southern Rus''', 1856–57), and elementary primers (Kulish's Hramatka, 1857, 1861, Shevchenko's Bukvar Yuzhnoruskiy, 1861). In Osnova, Kostomarov published his influential article "Dve russkiye narodnosti" ("Two Russian Nationalities").

Although Ukrainianism had been considered popular and somewhat chic in Russian cultural circles, a debate began at the time over its relation to the ideology of Russian Pan-Slavism, epitomised by a quotation of Pushkin ("will not all the Slavic streams merge into the Russian sea?"), and a rhetoric of criticism emerged. Conservative Russians called the Ukrainian movement a "Polish intrigue", and Polish commentators had been complaining that Ukrainianism had been used as a weapon against Polish culture in Right-Bank Ukraine.

After the 1861 emancipation of the serfs in the Russian Empire, many landowners were unhappy with the loss of their serfs, and peasants were generally displeased with the terms of the emancipation. In the atmosphere of discontent, increasing reports reached the imperial government that Ukrainian leaders were plotting to separate from Russia. The 1863 January Uprising in Poland raised tensions around the issue of ethnic separatism in general even further. Several Ukrainian activists were arrested, Sunday schools and hromadas were closed, and their publication activities were suspended.

A new Ukrainian translation by Pylyp Morachevskyi of parts of the New Testament was vetted and passed by the Imperial Academy of Sciences but rejected by the Holy Synod of the Russian Orthodox Church because it was considered politically suspect. In response, Interior Minister Count Pyotr Valuyev issued a decree through an internal document circulated to the censors on 18 July 1863, known as Valuyev's Circular, which implemented a policy based on the opinion of the Kyiv Censorship Committee, cited in the circular, that "the Ukrainian language never existed, does not exist, and shall never exist". The circular banned the publication of secular and religious books, apart from belles-lettres, on the premise that the distribution of such publications was a tool to foster separatist tendencies, coming primarily from Poland.

 Ems Ukaz 

In the 1870s, the Kyiv Hromada and the South-Western Branch of the Imperial Russian Geographic Society began to publish important works in Kyiv in the Russian language on Ukrainian ethnography. Authors included Mykhailo Drahomanov, Volodymyr Antonovych, Ivan Rudchenko, and Pavlo Chubynsky. They held an Archaeological Congress in 1874, and published in the Russian-language paper Kyivskiy telegraf.

A member of the Geographic Society, Mikhail Yuzefovich, sent two letters to St Petersburg warning of separatist activity. Tsar Alexander II appointed an Imperial Commission on Ukrainophile Propaganda in the Southern Provinces of Russia, which found evidence of a danger to the state and recommended extending the scope of the Valuyev Decree. While enjoying a spa in Bad Ems, Germany, on May 18, 1876, Alexander signed what would come to be called the Ems Ukaz, which extended the publication ban to all books and song lyrics in the "Little Russian dialect" and prohibited the import of such materials. Also, public lectures, plays, and song performances in Ukrainian were forbidden, as well as teaching of any discipline in Ukrainian. Prohibited was also preservation or circulation of any Ukrainian book in school libraries. Teachers suspected of Ukrainophilism were removed from teaching.

The ukaz coincided with other actions against Ukrainian culture. Drahomanov and the fellow activist Mykola Ziber were removed from their posts at Kyiv's University of St Vladimir and emigrated, along with other cultural leaders such as Fedir Vovk and Serhiy Podolynsky. The situation was exposed by professor Mykhailo Drahomanov at the 1878 Paris International Literary Congress.

 Yaryzhka 

In 1881, the new Emperor Alexander III amended the ukaz. Ukrainian lyrics and dictionaries were now allowed, but the Kulishivka Ukrainian alphabet was still prohibited, and such publications had to write Ukrainian with Russian orthography. That usage was disparagingly called the Yaryzhka by some Ukrainians in reference to the Russian letter yery . Performance of Ukrainian plays and humorous songs could be approved by governors or governors-general, but Ukrainian-only theatres and troupes could not be established. Earlier, in 1879, Russian Interior Minister Mikhail Loris-Melikov allowed the organization of theatrical performances and concerts in the Ukrainian language, but only on rural themes and outside Kiev.

Many illegal performances and publications were delivered by ingenuity and bribery, but Ukrainian cultural development practically ceased.

 Effectiveness of the ban 
The Ems Ukaz significantly limited the development of Ukrainian culture in Russia. The Hromada association, which had about 100 members before the ukaz, had only 14 after it, and in 1900 it was still only 25. The Ukrainian was excluded from education at every level. No press, scientific papers or modern, ambitious literature were published in the Ukrainian language. The Ukrainian language was slowly becoming the language of the lower, uneducated masses.

Nonetheless according to Ukrainian historian George Shevelov a plan to silence and annihilate Ukrainian literature failed completely. Books in Ukrainian were still published in the Russian Empire, albeit in the Russian alphabet and often after many years of effort. The Kievskaya Starina editors owned a bookstore with Ukrainian books in Kyiv. In 1898, the Moscow-based  began printing Ukrainian books for the Ukrainian peasantry. In 1903, Kiev Governor-General Mikhail Dragomirov allowed Kievskaya Starina to publish fiction in Ukrainian.

The ban on the import of Ukrainian newspapers and books into Russia has been similarly ineffective. Ukrainian newspapers published in Galicia had numerous subscribers in Russian Ukraine (for example, had 400 subscribers in 1890-1896).

 Aftermath 
After the Russian Revolution of 1905, the Imperial Academy of Sciences recommended the lifting of the ukaz's restrictions. Ukrainian-language newspapers began publication; Prosvita (‘Enlightenment’) educational societies were formed; some university professors lectured in Ukrainian; and the Orthodox bishop of the Podolia vicariate, Parfeniy Levytsky, allowed the language to be used in services and church schools there.

In 1910, concerned about potential revolutionary activity, Interior Minister Pyotr Stolypin restored the ukaz's restrictions and shut down the Prosvita societies and Ukrainian-language publications. The Russian-language press and intellectuals launched a campaign against the idea of Ukrainian autonomy or separatism.

Thus, self-aware Ukrainians remained a small intelligentsia in Dnieper Ukraine that was out of touch with a much larger rural population, which lacked the opportunity for a cultural education. The Russian imperial ideology dominated the schools and the army, and the Russian language was the only one used for official business in the urban workplace, government offices, and public services. In the meantime, Ukrainian self-identity would grow in Austro-Hungarian Galicia, which was out of reach of Russian imperial authorities.

The ukaz was never cancelled but became void, along with all other Imperial Russian laws, in the February Revolution of 1917–18. After the Revolution, Ukrainian language, education and culture was allowed to flower in the Ukrainian National Republic and the Hetmanate, and briefly, under the Ukrainization policies of Soviet Ukraine before 1931.

 Excerpt 

 See also 
 Valuev Circular
 Эмский указ, full text of the Ems Ukaz 

 References 

 Sources 
 Drahomanov, Mykhailo, La littérature oukrainienne, proscrite par le gouvernement russe: rapport présenté au Congrès littéraire de Paris (Ukrainian Literature Banned by the Russian Government: Report Presented at the Literary Congress in Paris), Geneva, 1878.
 Luckyj, George S.N. ([1956] 1990). Literary Politics in the Soviet Ukraine, 1917–1934, revised and updated edition, Durham and London: Duke University Press. .
 Magocsi, Paul Robert (1996). A History of Ukraine. Toronto: University of Toronto Press. .
 I.R., "Ne dozvoliaiu," Radians’kyi knyhar, 8 (April 1930):8
 Savchenko, Fedir (1970). Zaborona ukrayinstva 1876 r.'', 2nd ed. Munich.
 

1876 in the Russian Empire
1876 in Ukraine
Politics of the Russian Empire
Cultural history of Ukraine
Ukrainian language
Language policy in Russia
Anti-Ukrainian sentiment
Russification
Human rights abuses in Russia
Decrees of the Russian Empire
Language policy in Ukraine